"Limitless" is a song recorded by American singer Jennifer Lopez for the soundtrack of her romantic comedy film, Second Act (2018). It was released as a single on November 16, 2018. The video was released on YouTube on December 20, 2018.

Composition 
"Limitless" is a power ballad produced by Jesse Shatkin, who co-wrote the song with Sia. Over a piano and drums, Lopez sings about perseverance, stating in the chorus: "I'd given up on the saying ‘I’ll never give up’/ But look at me now/ Yeah, look at me, I'm limitless."

Live performances
Lopez performed the song on multiple occasions since its release.

She debuted the song with a performance at the American Music Awards on October 9, 2018. It opened with a voiceover that stated: "The only thing stopping you is you", which was followed by a poem by Jasmin Kaur. Lopez wore diamond-encrusted shoes, a jumpsuit and matching blazer. Lyndsey Havens of Billboard described the performance as "soaring and impactful".

On November 29, 2018, Lopez performed the song on The Ellen DeGeneres Show.

Lopez performed the song again on NBC's New Years Eve 2019 Television Special Live from Citi Walk in Los Angeles, "The Latina diva wore her hair in a sleek, high ponytail while sporting some glitzy eye makeup and bright red lips. JLo was all smiles as she was flanked by several dancers who wore the same sexy outfit, braving the cold of the Big Apple in order to put on a memorable NYE show for all those ringing in the new year together in the historic location."

The song is also featured on the setlist to her It's My Party (Tour) where she performs the song as a Duet with her daughter Emme.

Music video
Lopez directed the music video for "Limitless", her first time directing. The video was released on December 20, 2018, and features her daughter Emme.

Charts

Release history

References

2010s ballads
2018 songs
2018 singles
Jennifer Lopez songs
Songs written by Sia (musician)
Pop ballads
Songs written by Jesse Shatkin